The Ministry of Justice and Institutional Transparency of Bolivia is in charge of the justice sector of Bolivia. In addition. the ministry includes the following vice-ministries:

 Justice and Fundamental Rights
 Indigenous Peasant Native Justice
 Equal Opportunities
 Defense of User and Consumer Rights
 Institutional Transparency and Fight against Corruption

The ministry has gone by several names. For instance, in 2017, the Ministry of Institutional Transparency and Fight Against Corruption and the Ministry of Justice were merged by Supreme Decree 3058—thereby becoming the Ministry of Justice and Institutional Transparency.

List of ministers 
This list is incomplete, as it only shows the ministers who served post-1966.

Minister of Government, Justice & Immigration / Minister of Interior, Migration & Justice / Minister of Interior / Minister of Interior, Immigration & Justice 

 Antonio Arguedas Mendieta (1966–1968)
 Eufronio Padillacaere (1969)
 Juan Ayoroa (1970)
 Jorge Gallardo Lozada (1970–1971)
 Mario Adet Zamora Claros (1972–1973)
 Walter Castro Avendano (1974)
 Juan Asbun Pereda (1975–1977) 
 Guillermo Jimenez Gallo (1978) 
 Raul Leyton Lopez (1979)
 Jorge Selum Vaca Diez (1980) 
 Luis Arce Gomez (1981)

Minister of Interior, Migration & Justice 

 Romulo Mercado Garnica (1982) 
 Mario Roncal Antezana (1983) 
 Federico Alvarez Plata (1984–1985) 
 Fernando Barthelemy Martinez (1986–1987)
 Juan Carlos Duran Saucedo (1987–1989) 
 Guillermo Capobianco Rivera (1990) 
 Carlos Saavedra Bruno (1991–1993) 
 Carlos Morales Guillen (1993–1994)

Minister of Justice / Minister of Justice & Human Rights 

 Rene Blattman Bauer (1995–1996) 
 Raul Espana Smith (1997)
 Ana Maria Cortez de Soriano (1997–1999) [1st female]
 Carlos Alberto Subirana (2000)
 Juan Antonio Chahin Lupo (2000)
 Luis Angel Vasquez Villamor (2001)
 Mario Luis Serrate Ruiz (2002)
 Gina Luz Mendez Hurtado (2002–2003)
 Casimira Rodríguez (2006–2007)
 Celima Torrico Rojas (2007–2010)
 Nilda Copa (2010–2012)
 Sandra Elizabeth Gutierrez Salazar (2013–2014)
 Virginia Velasco Condori (2015–2017)

Minister of Justice and Institutional Transparency 

 Héctor Arce (2017–present)

See also 

 Justice ministry
 Ministry of Justice (Bolivia)
 Politics of Bolivia

References 

Justice ministries
Government of Bolivia